Tyler Allgeier (born April 15, 2000) is an American football running back for the Atlanta Falcons of the National Football League (NFL). He played college football at BYU.

High school career
Allgeier attended Henry J. Kaiser High School in Fontana, California. During his high school career he had a school record 5,000 rushing yards and 56 touchdowns. He committed to Brigham Young University (BYU) to play college football.

College career
In his first year at BYU in 2018, Allgeier played in four games and had nine carries for 49 yards. In 2019 he moved from running back to linebacker. He played in all 13 games that season recording 26 tackles and 0.5 sacks on defense and 119 yards on 17 carries on offense. Allgeier moved back to running back in 2020 and played in all 11 games with eight starts. He finished the year with 1,130 rushing yards on 150 carries with 13 touchdowns. He returned as BYU's starting running back in 2021. On December 28, 2021, Allgeier announced that he would forgo his remaining two years of eligibility and enter the draft.

Professional career

Allgeier was selected in the fifth round of the 2022 NFL Draft with the 151st overall pick by the Atlanta Falcons. He made his NFL debut in Week 2 against the Los Angeles Rams. In Week 4, against the Cleveland Browns, he had 104 scrimmage yards in the 23–20 victory. In Week 5, Allgeier made his first career start, due to a knee injury to running back Cordarrelle Patterson. In Week 7 against the Cincinnati Bengals, Allgeier recorded his first career rushing touchdown in the 17–35 loss. In Week 8 against the Carolina Panthers, Allgeier had his first career receiving touchdown in the 37–34 overtime win. In Week 15 against the New Orleans Saints, Allgeier recorded a season-high 139 rushing yards and a touchdown. In Week 17 against the Arizona Cardinals, Allgeier had 20 carries for 83 yards and a touchdown in the 20–19 win.

Allgeier finished his rookie season with 1,035 rushing yards, becoming the first Falcons running back since Devonta Freeman in 2016 and the first Falcons rookie running back since William Andrews in 1979 to rush for over a thousand yards. Allgeier also set the Falcons single-season rookie record for most rushing yards in a season, surpassing the mark previously set by Andrews.

NFL career statistics

References

External links
 
Atlanta Falcons bio
BYU Cougars bio

Living people
People from Fontana, California
Players of American football from California
Sportspeople from San Bernardino County, California
American football running backs
American football linebackers
BYU Cougars football players
2000 births
Atlanta Falcons players